James Menzies may refer to:
James Alexander Robertson Menzies (1821–1888), New Zealand colonial administrator
James Menzies (Australian politician) (1862–1945), member of the Victorian Legislative Assembly
James Menzies (Wisconsin politician) (1830–1913), member of the Wisconsin State Assembly
James Mellon Menzies, Canadian missionary
James Menzies, namesake of Menzies Creek, Victoria

See also
Jim Menzies (disambiguation)